The 1941 Tasmanian state election was held on 13 December 1941 in the Australian state of Tasmania to elect 30 members of the Tasmanian House of Assembly. The election used the Hare-Clark proportional representation system — six members were elected from each of five electorates.

The Labor Party had won the 1937 election with a three-seat majority over the Nationalist Party. Labor leader and Premier Albert Ogilvie had died in office on 10 June 1939, and had been replaced by Edmund Dwyer-Gray and then Robert Cosgrove, who led Labor into the 1941 election. Sir Henry Baker continued to lead the Nationalists.

In spite of Cosgrove's refusal to placate the Labor Party's left wing, and criticism from Bill Morrow of the Launceston Trades Hall Council, Labor consolidated its substantial majority even further, winning a further two seats for a total of 20.

Results

|}

Distribution of votes

Primary vote by division

Distribution of seats

See also
 Members of the Tasmanian House of Assembly, 1941–1946
 Candidates of the 1941 Tasmanian state election

References

External links
Assembly Election Results, 1941, Parliament of Tasmania.
Report on General Election, 1941, Tasmanian Electoral Commission.

Elections in Tasmania
1941 elections in Australia
1940s in Tasmania
December 1941 events